In grammar, the genitive case (abbreviated ) is the grammatical case that marks a word, usually a noun, as modifying another word, also usually a noun—thus indicating an attributive relationship of one noun to the other noun. A genitive can also serve purposes indicating other relationships. For example, some verbs may feature arguments in the genitive case; and the genitive case may also have adverbial uses (see adverbial genitive).

Genitive construction includes the genitive case, but is a broader category. Placing a modifying noun in the genitive case is one way of indicating that it is related to a head noun, in a genitive construction. However, there are other ways to indicate a genitive construction.  For example, many Afroasiatic languages place the head noun (rather than the modifying noun) in the construct state.

Possessive grammatical constructions, including the possessive case, may be regarded as a subset of genitive construction. For example, the genitive construction "pack of dogs" is similar, but not identical in meaning to the possessive case "dogs' pack" (and neither of these is entirely interchangeable with "dog pack", which is neither genitive nor possessive). Modern English is an example of a language that has a possessive case rather than a conventional genitive case. That is, Modern English indicates a genitive construction with either the possessive clitic suffix "-", or a prepositional genitive construction such as "x of y". However, some irregular English pronouns do have possessive forms which may more commonly be described as genitive (see English possessive). The names of the astronomical constellations have genitive forms which are used in star names, for example the star Mintaka in the constellation Orion (genitive Orionis) is also known as Delta Orionis or 34 Orionis.

Many languages have a genitive case, including Albanian, Arabic, Armenian, Basque, Danish, Dutch, Estonian, Finnish, Georgian, German, Greek, Gothic, Hungarian, Icelandic, Irish, Latin, Latvian, Lithuanian, Nepali, Romanian, Sanskrit, Scottish Gaelic, Swedish, Kannada, Tamil, Telugu, Turkish and all Slavic languages except Bulgarian and Macedonian.

Functions
Depending on the language, specific varieties of genitive-noun–main-noun relationships may include:
 possession (see possessive case, possessed case):
 inalienable possession ("Janet's height", "Janet's existence", "Janet's long fingers")
 alienable possession ("Janet's jacket", "Janet's drink")
 relationship indicated by the noun being modified ("Janet's husband")
 composition (see Partitive):
 substance ("a wheel of cheese")
 elements ("a group of men")
 source ("a portion of the food")
 participation in an action:
 as an agent ("She benefited from her father's love") – this is called the subjective genitive (Compare "Her father loved her", where Her father is the subject.)
 as a patient ("the love of music")  – this is called the objective genitive (Compare "She loves music", where music is the object.)
 origin ("men of Rome")
 reference ("the capital of the Republic" or "the Republic's capital")
 description ("man of honour", "day of reckoning")
 compounds ("doomsday" ("doom's day"), Scottish Gaelic "ball coise" = "football", where "coise" = gen. of "cas", "foot")
 apposition (Japanese 牛の角 (ushi no tsuno), "cow horn")
Depending on the language, some of the relationships mentioned above have their own distinct cases different from the genitive.

Possessive pronouns are distinct pronouns, found in Indo-European languages such as English, that function like pronouns inflected in the genitive. They are considered separate pronouns if contrasting to languages where pronouns are regularly inflected in the genitive. For example, English my is either a separate possessive adjective or an irregular genitive of I, while in Finnish, for example, minun is regularly agglutinated from minu- "I" and -n (genitive).

In some languages, nouns in the genitive case also agree in case with the nouns they modify (that is, it is marked for two cases). This phenomenon is called suffixaufnahme.

In some languages, nouns in the genitive case may be found in inclusio – that is, between the main noun's article and the noun itself.

English 

Old English had a genitive case, which has left its mark in modern English in the form of the possessive ending s (now sometimes referred to as the "Saxon genitive"), as well as possessive adjective forms such as his, their, etc., and in certain words derived from adverbial genitives such as once and afterwards. (Other Old English case markers have generally disappeared completely.) The modern English possessive forms are not normally considered to represent a grammatical case, although they are sometimes referred to as genitives or as belonging to a possessive case. One of the reasons that the status of ’s as a case ending is often rejected is that it does not behave as such, but rather as a clitic marking that indicates that a dependency relationship exists between phrases. One can say the King’s war, but also the King of France’s war, where the genitive marker is attached to the full noun phrase the King of France, whereas case markers are normally attached to the head of a phrase.
In languages having a true genitive case, such as Old English, this example may be expressed as þes cynges wyrre of France, literally "the King's war of France", with the ’s attaching to the King.

Finnic genitives and accusatives
Finnic languages (Finnish, Estonian, etc.) have genitive cases.

In Finnish, prototypically the genitive is marked with -n, e.g. maa – maan "country – of the country". The stem may change, however, with consonant gradation and other reasons. For example, in certain words ending in consonants, -e- is added, e.g. mies – miehen "man – of the man", and in some, but not all words ending in -i, the -i is changed to an -e-, to give -en, e.g.  lumi – lumen "snow – of the snow". The genitive is used extensively, with animate and inanimate possessors. In addition to the genitive, there is also a partitive case (marked -ta/-tä or -a/-ä) used for expressing that something is a part of a larger mass, e.g. joukko miehiä "a group of men".

In Estonian, the genitive marker -n has elided with respect to Finnish. Thus, the genitive always ends with a vowel, and the singular genitive is sometimes (in a subset of words ending with a vocal in nominative) identical in form to nominative.

In Finnish, in addition to the uses mentioned above, there is a construct where the genitive is used to mark a surname. For example, Juhani Virtanen can be also expressed Virtasen Juhani ("Juhani of the Virtanens").

A complication in Finnic languages is that the accusative case -(e)n is homophonic to the genitive case. This case does not indicate possession, but is a syntactic marker for the object, additionally indicating that the action is telic (completed). In Estonian, it is often said that only a "genitive" exists. However, the cases have completely different functions, and the form of the accusative has developed from *-(e)m. (The same sound change has developed into a synchronic mutation of a final m into n in Finnish, e.g. genitive sydämen vs. nominative sydän.) This homophony has exceptions in Finnish, where a separate accusative -(e)t is found in pronouns, e.g. kenet "who (telic object)", vs. kenen "whose".

A difference is also observed in some of the related Sámi languages, where the pronouns and the plural of nouns in the genitive and accusative are easily distinguishable from each other, e.g., kuä'cǩǩmi "eagles' (genitive plural)" and kuä'cǩǩmid "eagles (accusative plural)" in Skolt Sami.

German

 Formation 

 Articles 
The genitive singular definite article for masculine and neuter nouns is des, while the feminine and plural definite article is der. The indefinite articles are eines for masculine and neuter nouns, and einer for feminine and plural nouns (although the bare form cannot be used in the plural, it manifests in keiner, meiner, etc.)

 Nouns 
Singular masculine and neuter nouns of the strong declension in the genitive case are marked with -(e)s. Generally, one-syllable nouns favour the -es ending, and it is obligatory with nouns ending with a sibilant such as s or z. Otherwise, a simple -s ending is usual. Feminine and plural nouns remain uninflected:
   (of the contribution) – masculine
   (of the flower) – feminine
   (of the country) – neuter
   (of the trees) – plural
Singular masculine nouns (and one neuter noun) of the weak declension are marked with an -(e)n (or rarely -(e)ns) ending in the genitive case:
   (of the raven) – masculine
   (of the heart) – neuter

 Adjectives 
The declension of adjectives in the genitive case is as follows:

 Personal pronouns 
The genitive personal pronouns are quite rare and either very formal, literary or outdated. They are as follows (with comparison to the nominative pronouns):

Some examples:
   (Would you go instead of me?)
   (We are not worthy of her/them)
   (I will commemorate you)

 Relative pronouns 
Unlike the personal ones, the genitive relative pronouns are in regular use and are as follows (with comparison to the nominative relative pronouns):

Some examples:
  Kennst du den Schüler, dessen Mutter eine Hexe ist? (Do you know the student whose mother is a witch?) – masculine
 Sie ist die Frau, deren' Mann Rennfahrer ist (She is the woman whose husband is a racer) – feminine

Usage

Nouns 
The genitive case is often used to show possession or the relation between nouns:
die Farbe des Himmels (the colour of the sky)
Deutschland liegt im Herzen Europas (Germany lies in the heart of Europe)
der Tod seiner Frau (the death of his wife)
die Entwicklung dieser Länder (the development of these countries)
A simple s is added to the end of a name:
Claudias Buch (Claudia's book)

Prepositions 
The genitive case is also commonly found after certain prepositions:
 innerhalb eines Tages (within a day)
 statt des Hemdes (instead of the shirt)
 während unserer Abwesenheit (during our absence)
 jenseits der Berge (beyond the mountains)

Adjectives 
The genitive case can sometimes be found in connection with certain adjectives:
 Wir sind uns dessen bewusst (We are aware of that)
 Er ist des Diebstahls schuldig (He is guilty of theft)
 Das Kind ist der Ruhe bedürftig (The child is in need of calmness)
 Ich werde dieses Lebens überdrüssig (I am growing weary of this life)

Verbs 
The genitive case is occasionally found in connection with certain verbs (some of which require an accusative before the genitive); they are mostly either formal or legal:
 Die Stadt erfreut sich eines günstigen Klimas (The city enjoys a favourable climate)
 Gedenken Sie der Toten des Krieges (Remember those who died in (the) war)
 Wer klagte ihn des Mordes an? (Who accused him of murder?)
 Man verdächtigt euch des Betrugs (Someone suspects you of (committing) fraud)

Greek
The ablative case of Indo-European was absorbed into the genitive in Classical Greek. This added to the usages of the "genitive proper", the usages of the "ablatival genitive". The genitive occurs with verbs, adjectives, adverbs and prepositions.

Hungarian
The Hungarian genitive is constructed using the suffix -é.
madár ('bird'); madáré ('bird's')

The genitive -é suffix is only used with the predicate of a sentence: it serves the role of mine, yours, hers, etc. The possessed object is left in the nominative case. For example:
A csőr a madáré ('The beak is the bird's').

If the possessor is not the predicate of the sentence, the genitive is not used. Instead, the possessive suffixes (-(j)e or -(j)a in the third person singular, depending on vowel harmony) mark the possessed object. The possessor is left in the nominative if it directly precedes the possessed object (otherwise it takes a dative -nak/-nek suffix). For example: 
csőr ('beak'); csőre ('its beak')
a madár csőre/csőre a madárnak ('the bird's beak')

In addition, the suffix -i ('of') is also used. For example:
madár ('bird'); madári ('avian', 'of bird(s)')

Japanese
The Japanese possessive is constructed by using the grammatical particle no の to make the genitive case. For example:
Nominative: 猫 neko ('cat'); 手 te ('hand, paw')
Genitive: 猫の手 neko-no te ('cat's paw')
It also uses the suffix -na 〜な for adjectival noun; in some analyses adjectival nouns are simply nouns that take -na in the genitive, forming a complementary distribution (-no and -na being allomorphs).

The archaic genitive case particle -ga ～が is still retained in certain expressions, place names, and dialects.

Typically, languages have nominative case nouns converting into genitive case. It has been found, however, that the Kansai dialect of Japanese will in rare cases allow accusative case to convert to genitive, if specific conditions are met in the clause in which the conversion appears. This is referred to as "Accusative-Genitive conversion."

Latin
The genitive is one of the cases of nouns and pronouns in Latin. Latin genitives still have certain modern scientific uses:
Scientific names of living things sometimes contain genitives, as in the plant name Buddleja davidii, meaning "David's buddleia". Here davidii is the genitive of Davidius, a Latinized version of the Hebrew name. It is not capitalized because it is the second part of a binomial name.
Names of astronomical constellations are Latin, and the genitives of their names are used in naming objects in those constellations, as in the Bayer designation of stars. For example, the brightest star in the constellation Virgo is called Alpha Virginis, which is to say "Alpha of Virgo", as virginis is the genitive of virgō. Note that plural forms and adjectives also decline accordingly: plural Alpha Piscium (Pisces) and Alpha Canum Venaticorum (Canes Venatici) versus singular Alpha Piscis Austrini (Piscis Austrinus) and Alpha Canis Majoris (Canis Major). Astronomy manuals often list the genitive forms, as some are easy to get wrong even with a basic knowledge of Latin, e.g. Vela, which is a neuter plural not a feminine singular: Delta Velorum not *Delta Velae.
 Modus operandi, which can be translated to English as "mode of operation", in which operandi is a singular genitive gerund (i.e. "of operation"), not a plural of operandus as is sometimes mistakenly assumed.

Irish

The Irish language also uses a genitive case (tuiseal ginideach). For example, in the phrase bean an tí (woman of the house), tí is the genitive case of teach, meaning "house". Another example is barr an chnoic, "top of the hill", where cnoc means "hill", but is changed to chnoic, which also incorporates lenition.

Mandarin
In Mandarin Chinese, the genitive case is made by use of the particle 的 (de).

However, about persons in relation to oneself, 的 is often dropped when the context allows for it to be easily understood.

Persian

Old Persian had a true genitive case inherited from Proto-Indo-European. By the time of Middle Persian, the genitive case had been lost and replaced by an analytical construction which is now called Ezāfe. This construction was inherited by New Persian, and was also later borrowed into numerous other Iranic, Turkic and Indo-Aryan languages of Western and South Asia.

Semitic languages

Genitive case marking existed in Proto-Semitic, Akkadian, and Ugaritic. It indicated possession, and it is preserved today only in Arabic.

Akkadian
Nominative: šarrum (king)
Genitive: aššat šarrim (wife of king = king's wife)

Arabic
Called المجرور al-majrūr (meaning "dragged") in Arabic, the genitive case functions both as an indication of ownership (ex. the door of the house) and for nouns following a preposition.

Nominative: ٌبيت baytun (a house)
Genitive: ٍبابُ بيت bābu baytin (door of a house) ِبابُ البيت bābu l-bayti (door of the house)

The Arabic genitive marking also appears after prepositions.
e.g. ٍبابٌ لبيت bābun li-baytin (a door for a house)

The Semitic genitive should not be confused with the pronominal possessive suffixes that exist in all the Semitic languages

e.g. Arabic بيتي bayt-ī (my house) َكتابُك kitābu-ka (your [masc.] book).

Slavic languages

With the exception of Bulgarian and Macedonian, all Slavic languages decline the nouns and adjectives in accordance with the genitive case using a variety of endings depending on the word's lexical category, its gender, number (singular or plural) and in some cases meaning.

Possessives
To indicate possession the ending of the noun indicating the possessor changes depending on the word's ending in the nominative case. 
For example, to a, u, i or y in Polish, а, я, ы or и in Russian, а, я, y, ю, і, и or ей in Ukrainian, and similar cases in other Slavic languages.

Nominative: (pol.) "Oto Anton" / (rus.) "Вот Антон" / (ukr.) "Ось Антон" ("Here is Anton").
Genitive: (pol.) "Oto obiad Antonа" / (rus.) "Вот обед Антона" / (ukr.) "Ось oбід Антона" ("Here is Anton's lunch").

Possessives can also be formed by the construction (pol.) "u [subject] jest [object]" / (rus.) "У [subject] есть [object]"/ (ukr.) "у(в) [subject] є [object]"

Nominative: (pol.) "Oto Anton" / (rus.) "Вот Антон" / (ukr.) "Ось Антон" ("Here is Anton").
Genitive: (pol.) "u Antonа jest obiad / (rus.) "У Антона есть обед" / (ukr.) "У(В) Антона є обід" ("Anton has a lunch", literally: "(There) is a lunch at Anton's").

In sentences where the possessor includes an associated pronoun, the pronoun also changes:

Nominative: (pol.) Oto mój brat / (rus.) "Вот мой брат"/ (ukr.) "От мій брат"  ("Here is my brother").
Genitive: (pol.) "u mojego bratа jest obiad / (rus.) "У моего брата есть обед" / (ukr.) "У мого брата є обід"  ("My brother has a lunch", literally: "(There) is a lunch at my_brother's").

And in sentences denoting negative possession, the ending of the object noun also changes:

Nominative: (pol.) "Oto Irena" / (rus.) "Вот Ирена" / (ukr.) "От Ірена"  ("Here is Irene").
Genitive: (pol.) "Irena nie ma obiadu ("Irene does not have a lunch") or (pol.) "u Ireny nie ma obiadu ("(There) is no lunch at Irene's") 
Note that the Polish phrase "nie ma [object]" can work both as a negation of having [object] or a negation of an existence of [object], 
but the meaning of the two sentences and its structure is different. (In the first case [subject] is Irene, and in the second case [subject] is virtual, it is "the space" at Irene's place, not Irene herself)
Genitive: (rus.) "У Ирены нет обеда" ("Irene does not have a lunch", literally: "(There) is no lunch at Irene's"). 
Note that the Russian word "нет" is a contraction of "не" + "есть". 
In Russian there is no distinction between [subject] not having an [object] and [object] not being present at [subject]'s.
Genitive: (ukr.) "Ірена не має обіду ("Irene does not have a lunch") or (ukr.) "y Ірени нема(є) обіду ("At Irene's does not have a lunch") 
Note the difference  between the  spelling "не має [object]" and "нема(є) [object]" in both cases.

To express negation
The genitive case is also used in sentences expressing negation, even when no possessive relationship is involved. The ending of the subject noun changes just as it does in possessive sentences. The genitive, in this sense, can only be used to negate nominative, accusative and genitive sentences, and not other cases.

Nominative: (pol.) "(Czy) Maria jest w domu?" / (rus.) "Мария дома?" / (Чи) Марія (є) вдома? ("Is Maria at home?").
Genitive: (pol.) "Marii nie ma w domu" ("Maria is not at home", literally: "[virtual subject] has no Maria at home")
Genitive: (rus.) "Марии нет дома" ("Maria is not at home", literally: "Of Maria there is none at home.").
Genitive: (ukr.) "Марії нема(є) вдома" ("Maria is not at home", literally: "[virtual subject] has no Maria at home.")

Accusative: (pol.) "Mogę rozczytać twoje pismo" / (rus.) Могу (про)читать твой почерк / (ukr.) Можу (про)читати твій почерк ("I can read your handwriting")
Genitive: (pol.) "Nie mogę rozczytać twojego pisma" / (rus.) "Не могу (про)читать твоего почерка" / (ukr.) "Не можу (про)читати твого почерку" ("I can't read your handwriting")

Use of genitive for negation is obligatory in Slovene, Polish and Old Church Slavonic. Some East Slavic languages ( e.g. Russian and Belorussian) employ either the accusative or genitive for negation, although the genitive is more commonly used. In Czech, Slovak and Serbo-Croatian, negating with the genitive case is perceived as rather archaic and the accusative is preferred, but genitive negation in these languages is still not uncommon, especially in music and literature.

Partial direct object
The genitive case is used with some verbs and mass nouns to indicate that the action covers only a part of the direct object (having a function of non-existing partitive case), whereas similar constructions using the Accusative case denote full coverage. Compare the sentences:

Genitive: (pol.) "Napiłem się wody" / (rus.) "Я напился воды" / (ukr.) "Я напився води" ("I drank water," i.e. "I drank some water, part of the water available")
Accusative: (pol.) "Wypiłem wodę" / (rus.) "Я выпил воду / (ukr.) "Я випив воду  ("I drank the water," i.e. "I drank all the water, all the water in question")

In Russian, special partitive case or sub-case is observed for some uncountable nouns which in some contexts have preferred alternative form on -у/ю instead of standard genitive on -а/я: выпил чаю ('drank some tea'), but сорта чая ('sorts of tea').

Prepositional constructions
The genitive case is also used in many prepositional constructions. (Usually when some movement or change of state is involved, and when describing the source / destination of the movement. Sometimes also when describing the manner of acting.) 
Czech prepositions using genitive case: od (from), z, ze (from), do (into), bez (without), kromě (excepting), místo (instead of), podle (after, according to), podél (along), okolo (around), u (near, by), vedle (beside), během (during), pomocí (using, by the help of), stran (as regards) etc.
Polish prepositions using genitive case: od (from), z, ze (from), do, w (into), na (onto), bez (without), zamiast (instead of), wedle (after, according to), wzdłuż (along), około (around), u (near, by), koło (beside), podczas (during), etc.
Russian prepositions using genitive case: от (from), с, со (from), до (before, up to), без (without), кроме (excepting), вместо (instead of), после (after), вдоль (along), около (around), у (near, by), во время (during), насчёт (regarding), etc.

Turkish

The Turkish genitive, formed with a genitive suffix for the possessor, is used in combination with a possessive for the possessed entity, formed with a possessive suffix. For example, in "my mother's mother", the possessor is "my mother", and the possessed entity is "[her] mother". In Turkish:
Nominative: anne ("mother");
First-person possessive: annem ("my mother");
Third-person possessive: annesi ("[someone]'s mother"); 
Genitive of annem: annemin ("my mother's");
Genitive and possive combined: annemin annesi ("my mother's mother", i.e., "my maternal grandmother").

Albanian

The genitive in Albanian is formed with the help of clitics. For example:

Nominative: libër ('book'); vajzë ('girl'); 
Genitive: libri i vajzës (the girl's book)

If the possessed object is masculine, the clitic is i. If the possessed object is feminine, the clitic is e. If the possessed object is plural, the clitic is e regardless of the gender.

The genitive is used with some prepositions: me anë ('by means of'), nga ana ('on behalf of', 'from the side of'), për arsye ('due to'), për shkak ('because of'), me përjashtim ('with the exception of'), në vend ('instead of').

Dravidian languages

Kannada

In Kannada, the genitive case-endings are:

for masculine or feminine nouns ending in "ಅ" (a): ನ (na)
 Examples: sūrya-na ('of the sun')

for neuter nouns ending in "ಅ" (a): ದ (da)
 Examples: mara-da ('of the tree')

for all nouns ending in "ಇ" (i), "ಈ" (ī), "ಎ" (e), or "ಏ" (ē): ಅ (a)
 Examples: mane-y-a ('of the house'; note that a linking "y" is added between the stem and the suffix)

for all nouns ending in "ಉ" (u), "ಊ" (ū), "ಋ" (r̥), or "ೠ" (r̥̄): ಇನ (ina)
 Examples; guru-v-ina ('of the teacher'; note that a linking "v" is added between the stem and the suffix)

Most postpositions in Kannada take the genitive case.

Tamil

In Tamil, the genitive case ending is the word உடைய or இன், which signifies possession. Depending on the last letter of the noun, the genitive case endings may vary.

If the last letter is a consonant (மெய் எழுத்து), like க், ங், ச், ஞ், ட், ண், த், ந், ப், ம், ய், ர், ல், வ், ழ், then the suffix உடைய/இன் gets added. *Examples: His: அவன் + உடைய = அவனுடைய, Doctor's: மருத்துவர் + உடைய = மருத்துவருடைய, மருத்துவர் + இன் = மருத்துவரின் Kumar's: குமார் + உடைய = குமாருடைய, குமார்+ இன் = குமாரின்

See also
Genitive construction
Possessive case

References

Further reading

External links

German genitive case A lesson covering the genitive case in the German language
 Genitive Case In Arabic

Grammatical cases